BAP Almirante Grau was a scout cruiser of the Peruvian Navy, the lead ship of its class. Along with its sister ship Coronel Bolognesi, Almirante Grau was one of Peru's two most powerful warships for the first half of the twentieth century. The ship was named for Miguel Grau Seminario, naval hero of the country.

Historical data

Background 
During the presidency of Marshal Ramón Castilla, the Peruvian Navy was considered one of the most powerful in America, but as a consequence of the Pacific War warships were lost in action or sunk by their crews to prevent them from being captured by the enemy.

In order to remedy this situation, Peru acquired a couple of transports: Vilcanota (1884) and Perú (1885). In 1888, the cruise ship Lima arrived in Callao, acquired during the conflict with Chile and retained by The United Kingdom during the conflict. In the following years, the Chalaco and Constitución (1894) and Iquitos (1905) transports were incorporated; however, already well into the 20th century, several of these units were decommissioned. Also at this time, Peru was facing conflicts with Chile and Ecuador, which motivated the patriotic boards to raise money to acquire new naval units.

Construction and arrival in Peru 

The Admiral Grau was launched on March 27, 1906, and sailed in convoy together with the Coronel Bolognesi to the port of Callao, arriving on August 10 of 1907.

"Colonel Bolognesi" and her twin were for many years the pride of the Peruvian Navy. Its construction had been supervised by Rear Admiral Melitón Carvajal Ambulodegui, who would be the architect of the reconstruction of the Peruvian fleet. Both units still featured many elements of the protected cruiser, but were more robust, better armed and had greater range than the slightly slower contemporary British scouts.

The Grau class turned out to be excellent units, although they periodically had to undergo revision and maintenance work, and for half a century they were the most well known ships of the Peruvian Navy. Of the various partial modernizations to which they were subjected during their operational life, the most significant was the one carried out in 1935 with the emplacement of several anti-aircraft weapons. During World War II, the bridge was rebuilt and the traditional mast was replaced by a tripod one.

Official visit to Chile 

Naval Actions

1932 Northeast Military Campaign 
In 1932, the cruiser received her baptism of fire, intervening in the conflict with Colombia, together with the submarines R- 1 and R-4, sailing across the Atlantic and entering the Amazon River. She there she faced mercenaries hired by the Colombian State.

1941 North and Northeast Military Campaign 
At the outbreak of the conflict with Ecuador in 1941, this cruiser, along with the destroyer , was completing its annual run and careening in the Callao Naval Base, heading towards Paita on July 23, joining the theater of operations.

With its base in Zorritos, it carried out operations, without withdrawing to the base in Callao, since it would take part, with the other ships of the Squadron, in carrying out patrols in northern Peru due to the Second World War.

Decommissioning 
After more than 50 years of service, she was discharged in 1958 along with her twin,  Colonel Bolognesi .

References 

Almirante Grau-class cruisers of the Peruvian Navy
Ships built in Barrow-in-Furness
1906 ships